Guangshen railway or Guangzhou–Shenzhen railway, also known as the Chinese section of the Kowloon–Canton railway in 1911–1949, is a railway in Guangdong province in the People's Republic of China, between Guangzhou and Shenzhen. It is operated by Guangshen Railway Co., Ltd., a publicly traded company.

Now it has four tracks between Guangzhou East and Shenzhen railway station. In order to reduce the interference to passenger trains in the daytime from lower-speed freight trains, most freight trains will be scheduled to run at night.

Guangshen railway connects with several other important railways to different directions. It links Jingguang railway and Guangmao railway in Guangzhou, Jingjiu railway in Dongguan (with which shares two regular speed track), and the East Rail line to Hong Kong at the southern end of the railway. Besides, there are some branch lines along Guangshen Railway, such as Pingyan railway to Yantian Port, Pingnan railway to Shenzhen West railway station and also the line to Huangbu Port.

Cross-border services from Hong Kong to Dongguan (Changping), Guangzhou East, Foshan and Zhaoqing, as well as to Beijing West and Shanghai use its route.

History

The idea of constructing a railway linking Canton (now Guangzhou) and Kowloon in Hong Kong, a British crown colony germinated in the late Qing dynasty. In 1899, Britain and the Qing government agreed to construct the Kowloon–Canton railway (KCR, also known as Canton-Kowloon Railway), but Britain postponed the construction as Britain was busy at the Second Boer War in Africa. In 1907, Qing government and Britain formally signed an agreement in Peking on issuing a £100-million bond as part of loan for the construction of the Chinese section of the Kowloon–Canton railway. In July 1907, construction of the British Section of the KCR began. The construction of Chinese section was delayed and only started in 1909. Under the loan contract, China needed to employ the British engineers for the construction of Chinese section, but China still employed famous Chinese railway engineer, Zhan Tianyou, as a consultant. The northern end of railway at that time was located in Dashatou, Guangzhou, was demolished in 1951. The through train service between Kowloon and Guangzhou also started to operate at the same time.

After the establishment of People's Republic of China in October 1949, the 'Chinese section of the Canton–Kowloon railway' was renamed 'Guangshen railway', and repairs were made to sections of the railroad damaged during the war. In 1967, railway department carried out a comprehensive maintenance on Guangshen railway to improve the transport capacity. Beginning in the 1980s economic reform policies of China, the establishment of Shenzhen Special Economic Zone and rapid economic development in the Pearl River Delta region has brought large volume of imported goods and increased passenger demand to the railway. Therefore, the second line of Guangshen Railway was constructed during 1984 to 1987 in order to meet the huge demand. Simultaneously Guangshen Railway Company (the predecessor of Guangshen Railway Company), which was directly subordinated to the Guangzhou Railway Bureau (now Guangzhou Railway Group), was established. This company was in charge of the construction projects and operational management of Guangshen Railway. In 1987, Guangshen railway became the first double-track railway in Guangdong province.

Image gallery

Indeed, Guangshen railway is the first place in China to carry out successfully speed-up on the existing railroad. At 28 December 1991, the construction of the third line of Guangshen railway, and the speed-up improvement works of original double tracks started. In October 1994, the maximum speed of a train reached  during the test. At 22 December 1994, the first sub-high speed passenger train in China started commercial operation between Guangzhou and Shenzhen.

In 1998, the electrification of two sub-high speed lines of Guangshen railway was finished. A Swedish-built X 2000 tilting train called 'Xinshisu' began to serve intercity train service between Guangzhou and Shenzhen, as well as the through train to Hong Kong. The train are 165m long, consisting of a power car, five passenger cars, and a trailing car. The non-power cars can have a pitch of up to 8 degrees.

Construction of the fourth track was commenced at 31 December 2005, and was finished at 18 April 2007 in time for the Sixth Speed-Up Campaign. Since then Guangshen railway has been the first four-track railway in mainland China and it allows passenger trains and freight trains to run on separate lines.

Guangshen intercity trains

As of 2007, intercity train service between Guangzhou and Shenzhen uses 8-car CRH1A highspeed EMU. There are 100 pairs of trains operated daily, in which 98 pairs will stop for 1.5 minutes at three stations: Zhangmutou, Dongguan and Shilong. On the 'As-frequent-as-buses' basis, one pair of trains is dispatched every 5 minutes on average during peak hours. The fastest journey time is 52 minutes between Guangzhou East and Shenzhen for D7002 and D7008 with no stop.

Rolling stock

Stations

Stations with services
Most of the stations on the line are now abandoned for passenger service. Currently, the only stations on the line offering passengers service are, in order:

All existing stations

Cross-Line Traffic 
There are services of EMUs using Guangzhou–Shenzhen railway as part of the route. 12 daily trains are offered between Guangzhou East Railway Station and Chaoshan Railway Station, one of which will continue to Xiamen. Starting 10 July 2019, there will also be a daily service between Shenzhen Railway Station and Huaiji Railway Station on Guiyang-Guangzhou HSR.

See also

China Railway
List of railway lines in China
Rail transport in China
Kowloon–Canton Railway
Guangzhou–Shenzhen–Hong Kong Express Rail Link
 Guangzhou–Shanwei high-speed railway

References

External links
Guangshen Railway (official site)
MTR Intercity Passenger Services

Rail transport in Guangdong
Railway lines in China
Railway lines opened in 1911
Standard gauge railways in China
1911 establishments in China